The 1910 Oklahoma gubernatorial election was held on November 8, 1910, and was a race for Governor of Oklahoma. Democrat  Lee Cruce defeated Republican J. W. McNeal.  Also on the ballot were J. T. Cumbie of the Socialist Party and George E. Rouch of the Prohibition Party.

Democratic primary
Ardmore attorney and banker Lee Cruce defeated three other candidates to win the nomination, including future governor 'Alfalfa Bill' Murray.

Primary Results

Republican primary
In a race where all four candidates achieved significant vote percentages, J. W. McNeal came out on top.

Results

Results

References

1910
Gubernatorial
Okla